Yoxall is a large village in Staffordshire, England.

Yoxall may also refer to:

 Harry Yoxall (1896–1984), British publisher
 James Yoxall (1857–1925), British Liberal Party politician and trade unionist
 Leslie Yoxall (1914–2005), British codebreaker at Bletchley Park during World War II

See also
 

English toponymic surnames